Jasper Wilson (born July 12, 1947) is an American former professional basketball player.

Wilson was born in Camden, Arkansas and attended Southern University. In his final season at Southern, he scored at least 24 points in every game. Between 1968 and 1969, he played parts of two seasons in the American Basketball Association as a member of the New Orleans Buccaneers. He averaged 5.2 points per game in his ABA career.

Notes

1947 births
Living people
American men's basketball players
Baltimore Bullets (1963–1973) draft picks
Basketball players from Arkansas
New Orleans Buccaneers players
People from Camden, Arkansas
Southern Jaguars basketball players
Small forwards